The Birth of Venus is a 15th century painting by Sandro Botticelli.

The Birth of Venus may also refer to:

Visual arts
 Venus Anadyomene, one of the iconic representations of the goddess Venus
The Birth of Venus (Boucher), 1754
The Birth of Venus (Bouguereau), 1879
The Birth of Venus (Cabanel), 1863
The Birth of Venus (Fragonard), c. 1753
The Birth of Venus (Gérôme), or Venus Rising (The Star), 1890
The Birth of Venus (Gervex), 1907
The Birth of Venus (Poussin), or Triumph of Neptune and Amphitrite, c.1695
The Birth of Venus, by Eugène Emmanuel Amaury Duval, 1862

Other uses
The Birth of Venus (novel), by Sarah Dunant, 2003
La Naissance de Vénus, an 1892 composition by Gabriel Fauré

See also
 
 Aphrodite#Birth
 Venus (mythology)
 Venus Anadyomene (Titian)
 Venus Anadyomene (Ingres)